Two ships of the United States Navy have been assigned the name Aggressor.

 USS Aggressor (AMc-63) was an  coastal minesweeper. She was renamed  on 23 May 1941 while under construction. Advance was launched on 28 June 1941 and stricken on 3 January 1946.
 USS Alliance (AMc-64) was an Accentor-class coastal minesweeper. She was renamed  on 23 May 1941 while under construction. Aggressor was launched on 19 July 1941 and stricken on 21 January 1946.

Sources

United States Navy ship names